The 2007 Donington Park Superbike World Championship round was the third round of the 2007 Superbike World Championship. It took place on the weekend of 30 March–1 April 2007. The round at Donington marked World Superbike's 20th anniversary with the first ever meeting being held at the Derbyshire circuit on 3 April 1988. For the 2007 season World Superbike returned to Donington Park for the first time since 2001.

Overview
In celebration of the 20th anniversary a parade lap of former Superbike stars and champions was organised featuring Fred Merkel, Aaron Slight, Scott Russell, Piergiorgio Bontempi, Peter Goddard, Marco Lucchinelli, Davide Tardozzi, Fabrizio Pirovano, Roger Burnett, James Whitham, Pierfrancesco Chili, Neil Hodgson and John Reynolds.

On lap six of the first World Superbike race of the day, Troy Bayliss crashed at Coppice corner. His right hand was momentarily caught between the handle bar and the frame of the motorcycle during the crash; the resulting injury required the surgical removal of the intermediate and distal phalanges of his little finger. In the same incident he also suffered an injury to the groin described by the rider as a split atom.

Superbike race 1 classification

Superbike race 2 classification

Supersport classification

Aggregate

References

 Superbike Race 1
 Superbike Race 2
 Supersport Race

Donington Park Round
Donington